Dan Lewis-Williams (born 12 October 1993) is an English cricketer. He made his first-class debut on 2 April 2015, for Cardiff MCCU against Glamorgan, as part of the 2015 Marylebone Cricket Club University fixtures. In April 2019, he was named in the MCC team that played in the 2019 Central American Cricket Championship in Mexico.

References

External links
 

1993 births
Living people
English cricketers
Cardiff MCCU cricketers
Place of birth missing (living people)
Wales National County cricketers